Héricourt is a commune in the Haute-Saône department in the region of Bourgogne-Franche-Comté in eastern France. Héricourt is the second most populated commune in the department after Vesoul. The town is part of the functional area of Montbéliard, but is also close to Belfort.

Héricourt is linked to the little villages of Brévilliers, Chagey, Champey, Chenebier, Coisevaux, Couthenans, Echenans sous Mont-Vaudois, Etobon, Luze, Mandrevillars, Saulnot, Trémoins, Verlans, Villers-sur-Saulnot, Vyans-le-Val and they form the Communauté de communes du pays d'Héricourt. On 1 January 2019, the former commune Tavey was merged into Héricourt.

Population

Culture and Heritage

Monuments 

The "Grosse tour" is the only tower which remains, a vestige of the medieval castle. In the courtyard, one can still access the old well, and the storeroom has been converted into a receiving room.
The Lutheran church of Saint-Christophe is quite important to the history of Héricourt because it shows the passing of the Wurtemberg's Dukes, just as in Montbéliard.
The Minal Museum was named after Emile Minal, a man who lived in the city and who had accumulated many works of art. When he died, his wife donated his collection of art to the city. The Museum hosts many temporary expositions
The factory's chimney remains to remind us of the ancient industry of weaving.
The fountain of "Savourot" is quite particular because of his half-circle shape. More recently, the city has decided to raze to the ground the house which obstructed the view to the fountain.

See also
Communes of the Haute-Saône department

References

Communes of Haute-Saône